Anthony DesLauriers (born December 16, 1987) is a former professional Canadian football player.

Football career
DeLurieres was drafted by the Toronto Argonauts in the sixth round of the 2009 CFL Draft and played CIS football for the Simon Fraser Clan. In January 2010, DesLauriers signed with the Argonauts but was released by the team on June 12. When Simon Fraser University joined the NCAA for the 2010 season, DesLauriers was ineligible to rejoin his team and transferred to the University of Calgary to play for the Dinos. On January 15, 2011, DesLauriers signed with the Montreal Alouettes as a defensive back.

References

External links
Simon Fraser Clan bio
Montreal Alouettes bio

1987 births
Living people
People from Surrey, British Columbia
Players of Canadian football from British Columbia
Simon Fraser Clan football players